Rajouri Garden Assembly constituency is one of the 70 Delhi Legislative Assembly constituencies of the National Capital Territory in India.

Overview
The current Rajouri Garden constituency came into existence in 2008 as a part of the implementation of the recommendations of the Delimitation Commission of India constituted in 2002.
Rajouri Garden is part of West Delhi Lok Sabha constituency along with nine other Assembly segments, namely, Madipur, Tilak Nagar, Hari Nagar, Najafgarh, Janakpuri, Vikaspuri, Dwarka, Matiala and Uttam Nagar.

Members of Legislative Assembly

Election results

2020

2017 results

2015

2013

Elections in the 2000s

Elections in the 1990s

See also
 Rajouri Garden

References

Assembly constituencies of Delhi
Delhi Legislative Assembly
West Delhi district